The Hart County News-Herald is a weekly newspaper serving Hart County in South-Central Kentucky, including Munfordville, Bonnieville and Horse Cave. Headquartered in Horse Cave, it is owned by Jobe Publishing, Inc.

The News-Herald is part of Jobe Publishing's news and advertising network that also publishes weekly newspapers in Barren, Butler, Edmonson, Metcalfe, and Monroe Counties, all of which, along with the News-Herald, are members of the Kentucky Press Association.

References

External links 
Jobe Publishing - default website for the company and its associated newspapers
News-Herald at SmallTown Newspapers

Hart County, Kentucky
Newspapers published in Kentucky
Publications established in 1886